Heymo was a medieval Bishop of Wrocław, Poland from 1120–1126.

Little is known about his origins, career or his Episcopal work, although he was probably from Lorraine or Flanders.

References

 

Bishops of Wrocław